E355 may refer to:
 Adipic acid, industrially important dicarboxylic acid
 Toshiba E355, Pocket PC device by Toshiba